Have You Met Hank Jones (also released as Hank Jones Solo Piano) is a solo album by American jazz pianist Hank Jones recorded in 1956 for the Savoy label.

Reception

Allmusic stated "Despite being a strong two-handed pianist falling into the transition between swing and bop, Jones tends to sound more swinging in a trio format, although these melodic and sometimes rhapsodic solos are also reasonably enjoyable".

Track listing
 "It Had To Be You" (Isham Jones, Gus Kahn) - 3:12
 "Heart and Soul" (Hoagy Carmichael, Frank Loesser) - 3:14
 "Let's Fall in Love" (Harold Arlen, Ted Koehler) - 3:23
 "But Not for Me" (George Gershwin, Ira Gershwin) - 2:50
 "Kankakee Shout" (Hank Jones) - 3:10
 "Body & Soul" (Johnny Green, Edward Heyman, Robert Sour, Frank Eyton) - 3:37
 "How About You?" (Burton Lane, Ralph Freed) - 2:28
 "Gone with the Wind" (Allie Wrubel, Herb Magidson) - 3:15
 "Teddy's Dream" (Teddy Von Seele) - 3:05
 "Have You Met Miss Jones?" (Richard Rodgers, Lorenz Hart) - 3:12
 "You Don't Know What Love Is" (Gene de Paul, Don Raye) - 4:08
 "Solo Blues" (Jones) - 4:51

Personnel 
Hank Jones - piano

References 

1956 albums
Hank Jones albums
Savoy Records albums
Albums produced by Ozzie Cadena
Albums recorded at Van Gelder Studio
Solo piano jazz albums